"Love Me Harder" is a song by American singer Ariana Grande and Canadian singer the Weeknd from Grande's second studio album, My Everything (2014). It was written by the Weeknd, Max Martin, Savan Kotecha, Peter Svensson, Ali Payami and Belly. The song was produced by Payami and Peter Carlsson, with Svensson serving as a vocal producer. It was released by Republic Records on September 30, 2014, as the fourth single from the album. "Love Me Harder" is a pop, synthwave, synth-pop, R&B ballad with a "throbbing, electro-heavy chorus", a guitar riff and "big vacuum-esque synths". Lyrically, the song features double entendres about rough sex.

In the United States, the song peaked at number seven on the Billboard Hot 100, becoming Grande's fourth consecutive top-ten single off the album and making her the artist with the most top-ten singles in 2014. The song also became the Weeknd's first top ten entry in the US. The Hannah Lux Davis-directed video finds Grande writhing on a sandy floor and the Weeknd walking through a rainstorm. As of April 2018, the song had sold 1.7 million copies in the United States, and has since been certified triple platinum by the RIAA.

Background and release
The collaboration between Grande and The Weeknd was pushed by their mutual label, Republic Records. Grande and The Weeknd were up-and-coming artists in 2013, with both releasing their debut albums that year. In an interview with Billboard, Republic Records executive vice president Charlie Walk stated, "The Weeknd is positioned to be best new artist of 2014. He is that guy." Producer Max Martin sent The Weeknd an unfinished version of the track. According to The Weeknd, "It was a great song, but it was a little generic. I couldn't hear myself on it. So I changed it and made it dark." Martin liked The Weeknd's revised lyrics. The Weeknd later recalled that "It was kind of like the label giving me an alley-oop. I think that's where the stars aligned for me. When I see an opening I penetrate it." In June 2014, Walk posted a photo on his Instagram with the caption, "When you talk about artist development and pure talent, The Weeknd comes to mind. I just heard a duet with a female friend of ours that’s a global smash. Can’t wait for the fall!." Later, it was revealed that the collaborator was Ariana Grande.

Later, Walk admitted that the collaboration was part of a strategy to promote The Weeknd, saying, "It's no accident that the new Ariana track features The Weeknd. That's strategic, because he's about to blow up with his own record." On June 30, 2014, it was revealed the track list for Grande's second studio album and the collaboration with The Weeknd was called "Love Me Harder". The song was first teased during a post on Grande's Instagram account, where she shared a 15-second snippet of the track on August 4, 2014, and later during a preview of four tracks on MTV's website on August 20, 2014. Chris Martins of Spin thought the preview has Grande getting "downright nasty" on the track. Later, "Love Me Harder" was announced to be the album's fourth single, being serviced to US rhythmic-crossover radio on September 30, 2014.

Composition

"Love Me Harder" was written by Max Martin, Savan Kotecha, Peter Svensson,  Ali Payami, Abel Tesfaye and the rapper Belly. It was produced by Payami and Peter Carlsson, while Svensson provided vocal production. The song is a duet sung between Grande and The Weeknd. According to the sheet music published at Musicnotes.com by Kobalt Music Group, the song is composed in the key of C minor with a moderately tempo of 100 beats per minute. Grande's vocals range from the note of E3 to F5. It is a midtempo synthwave, pop, synth-pop and R&B ballad, which starts small and mellow, before having "a 'throbbing', electro-heavy chorus", with a guitar riff, while "big vacuum-esque synths zip" are heard throughout the track. Meanwhile, Richard S. He from Billboard described the song as "A sparkling synthwave-R&B track that teeters on the edge of explicit—and is all the more seductive for it". Rob Copsey wrote for The Official Charts Company that "Love Me Harder" is reminiscent of Drake's "most emotional" songs like "Find Your Love" (2010) and "Hold On, We're Going Home" (2013), while Nick Levine of Time Out called the song a "cross between Robyn and Mariah Carey".

Lyrically, the song has Grande demanding for romantic satisfaction, filled with double entendres about rough sex. In the beginning, Grande wants a man to "utterly satisfy her in moments of breath taking, space invading, pleasure, pain, lip biting and bliss," singing: "Baby, in that moment, you'll know this is/Something bigger than us and beyond bliss." In the chorus, she lets her potential mate know that if he is really serious about keeping her, he has to up his game, warning: "'Cause if you want to keep me, you gotta, gotta, gotta, gotta, got to love me harder/And if you really need me, you gotta, gotta, gotta, gotta, got to love me harder." Later, The Weeknd plays a role of a shady love interest with skeletons in his closet, with lines about "how it feels for a woman to have intercourse," followed by carnal promises, singing: "Can you feel the pressure between your hips/ I’ll make you feel like the first time." In the bridge, "Grande and Weeknd trade provocative 'oohs'."

Critical reception

The song received critical acclaim upon its release.
Stephen Thomas Erlewine of AllMusic noted that Grande allowed the Weeknd to "suck up" the spotlight on the track. Jason Lipshut of Billboard noted that "the pairing somehow makes sense," praising the Weeknd's "ultra-sincere crooning" and the "driving guitar riff" for being "delicious 80's cheese". Mikael Wood of the Los Angeles Times called it a "darker (and more fully realized) R&B jam than anyone probably expected from a 21-year-old singer once known for her endless supply of pastel princess dresses." Kitty Empire of The Guardian wrote that the song's "saturated, mid-tempo atmospherics" stand out, noting that Weeknd's "own sleaze quotient is radically toned down here, but this remains sophisticated stuff, where Grande surprisingly holds her own." Michelle Geslani of Consequence of Sound labelled it "yearning and infectious," calling the pairing "a match made in vocal heaven — Grande’s feathery vox and The Weeknd’s slick croon complement one another rather perfectly." Bradley Stern wrote for Idolator that the track is "an irresistibly smooth synth-pop production," while Carolyn Menyes of Music Times was very receptive with the duo, writing that "they meld really well together."

Writing for The Official Charts Company, Rob Copsey named it the sexiest song on the album, also calling it a "sultry number." Lindsay Zoladz of Vulture.com claimed the song "is not only one of her strongest tracks to date, but it’s also the least bad thing The Weeknd has done in recent memory." Adam Workman of The National wrote Grande is "effective" on the track and that The Weeknd "worryingly hits higher-pitched peaks than Grande." Aimee Cliff of Fact picked it as the album's highlight, saying that the song "is actually improved by The Weeknd’s presence, [...] his sleaze is turned down several notches as his clean-cut falsetto battles Ariana’s octave-juggling over an irresistible thump." Lewis Corner of Digital Spy praised Grande for "successfully drag[ging] The Weeknd out of his Pitchfork mixtape mindset to sound like an upbeat popstar over subtle grooves and disco claps on [the] captivating serenade [track]." Nick Levine of Time Out called the song "gorgeous", while Rory Cashin of entertainment.ie found that the song has "Grande at her most obviously sexy without being overly explicit, and it works fantastically." Evan Sawdey of PopMatters went out to describe it as "the best song Grande has put out to date," declaring: "The dark, sensual throb of The Weeknd collaboration 'Love Me Harder' actually showcases Grande's voice in its most effective setting, the slow-motion strobelight jam allowing her to come off as teasing, assertive, and knowing all at once." Edwin Ortiz of Complex placed the song at number 8 on "The 50 Best Songs of 2014" list, declaring: "The unlikely pairing of Ariana Grande and The Weeknd proved to be a stroke of genius on 'Love Me Harder', a seductive synth-pop duet that manages to push both artists out of their comfort zones, while also remaining appealing to each of their core values. [...] 'Love Me Harder' is earmarked as a defining musical moment of 2014. Stroke of genius, indeed."

Commercial performance
In the United States, after spending a couple of weeks on the Bubbling Under Hot 100 Singles chart, "Love Me Harder" made its official debut on the Billboard Hot 100 at number 79. The following week, it jumped to number 57 before ascending to number 37 in its third week, becoming the Weeknd's first top-40 single on the chart. In its fifth week, after the music video's official release, "Love Me Harder" soared to its peak of number seven, becoming Grande's fourth consecutive top-ten single from My Everything, and fifth overall. By becoming her fourth top ten single, Grande became the singer with most top ten entries of 2014, along with her past top ten singles "Problem", "Break Free", and "Bang Bang". In addition, "Love Me Harder" became the Weeknd's first top ten entry on the Billboard Hot 100. As of April 2018, the song had sold 1.7 million copies in the United States and has been certified triple platinum by the Recording Industry Association of America (RIAA).

In Canada, the single reached the top ten, and entered the top twenty in many other countries such as Australia, Finland, Italy and the Netherlands. In many countries, the song became the Weeknd's first chart appearance.

Music video

Background and development
On October 1, 2014, Grande confirmed she was working on the music video for "Love Me Harder" and Grande's manager Scooter Braun posted a picture on Instagram of the set. In the following days, Grande teased fans by posting photos from the video shoot. The lyric video for "Love Me Harder" was released on October 18, 2014. The music video was directed by Hannah Lux Davis, who also directed the video for Grande's joint single "Bang Bang." A behind-the-scenes video was released on October 28, 2014, where Davis discussed the video's concept, claiming: "Our visuals are really about this tug of war of just loving harder and the compromise of giving in and needing more and wanting more." It premiered on Vevo on November 3, 2014, and surpassed 100 million views on January 11, 2015, making it Grande's fifth Vevo-certified music video, following "The Way", "Problem", "Break Free", as well as her joint single with Jessie J and Nicki Minaj, "Bang Bang".

Synopsis and reception
The video opens with "dramatic lightning in a sky boiling over with orange clouds." Throughout the music video, Ariana and the Weeknd "withstand earth, wind and water, symbolizing what one would do for love," as MTV's Emilee Lindner claimed. Lindner continued: "Grande writhes around on a sandy floor, the Weeknd walks nonchalantly through an indoor rain storm, and toward the end, we find Ariana in a pool of water with an air of confidence. At one point, they sing back-to-back, ultimately illustrating what the song is about — being unable to face the wants and needs of a relationship." Lidner called it "her most serious video to date." Gabby Bess of Paper called its visuals "a departure from her previous videos and mark a new, sultry era for the mini diva." Ariana Bacle of Entertainment Weekly agreed, snorting that "The video’s vibe, sensual and mysterious, is an obvious departure from Grande’s earlier work [...] but fits the song, a stripped-down ballad that’s meant to showcase the two singers’ voices."

Live performances
Grande and The Weeknd performed the song together live for the first time on the season 40 premiere of Saturday Night Live on September 27, 2014 and for a second time at the American Music Awards on November 23, 2014. Grande also performed part of the song as part of a medley at the 2014 Victoria's Secret Fashion Show, which aired on December 9, 2014 on CBS, and again at the 2015 NBA All-Star Game on February 15, 2015. She also performed the song during The Honeymoon Tour (2015). The performance started with her alone atop a pedestal that rose at the back of the stage. During the shows in Miami, Florida and Inglewood, California, Justin Bieber performed the track with her. "Love Me Harder" was part of Grande's set list at the Dangerous Woman Tour and One Love Manchester, a benefit concert she headlined on June 4, 2017, for the victims of the Manchester Arena bombing. She also performed the song during the Sweetener World Tour on all dates from March 19, 2019, to October 16, 2019, before it got removed.

Track listing
 Digital download – EP edition
 "Love Me Harder"  – 3:56
 "Cadillac Song" – 2:52
 "Too Close" – 3:35
 Digital download – "The Unreal Remixes EP"
 "Love Me Harder (Thèmemoir's UKG Remix)" – 3:09
 "Love Me Harder (Linear Curb Remix)" – 3:19
 "Love Me Harder (Pyrococcus Remix)" – 5:11
 "Love Me Harder (RIKAAR Lovers mX)" – 5:37

Credits and personnel
Credits adapted from My Everything liner notes.

Recording
 Recorded at Conway Recording Studios (Los Angeles, California), Wolf Cousins Studio (Stockholm, Sweden), P.S. Studio (Stockholm, Sweden)
 The Weeknd's vocals recorded at Studio at the Palms, (Las Vegas, Nevada)
 Mixed at MixStar Studios (Virginia Beach, Virginia)
 Mastered at Sterling Sound (New York City, New York)

Management
 MXM (ASCAP) — administered by Kobalt Songs Music Publishing, Inc. —, Prescription Songs/P.S. Publishing (STIM), Wolf Cousins (STIM), Warner/Chappell Music Scand (STIM), Songs Music Publishing, LLC o/b/o Songs of SMP (ASCAP)/WB Music Corp. (ASCAP) and CP Music Group (SOCAN)
 All rights on behalf of itself and CP Music Group (SOCAN)
 The Weeknd appears courtesy of XO & Co.

Personnel

 Ariana Grande – lead vocals
 The Weeknd – lead vocals, songwriting
 Max Martin – songwriting, background vocals
 Ali Payami – songwriting, production, programming, bass, keyboards, drums, percussion
 Ahmad Balshe – songwriting
 Peter Svensson – songwriting, production
 Peter Carlsson – vocal production
 Sibel – background vocals
 Niklas Ljungfelt – guitar
 Peter Zimney – saxophone
 Sam Holland – engineering
 Eric Weaver – engineering
 Jason "DaHeala" Quenneville – engineering, vocals recording (the Weeknd)
 Cory Bice – engineering assistant
 Serban Ghenea – mixing
 John Hanes – mixing engineering
 Tom Coyne – mastering
 Aya Merrill – mastering

Charts

Weekly charts

Year-end charts

Certifications and sales

Release history

References

External links
 

2010s ballads
2014 singles
2014 songs
Ariana Grande songs
Contemporary R&B ballads
Male–female vocal duets
Music videos directed by Hannah Lux Davis
Republic Records singles
Songs about BDSM
Songs written by Ali Payami
Songs written by Belly (rapper)
Songs written by Max Martin
Songs written by Peter Svensson
Songs written by Savan Kotecha
Songs written by the Weeknd
Synth-pop ballads
Synthwave songs
The Weeknd songs